Hijli Detention Camp (now called Shaheed Bhavan, IIT Kharagpur), is a former detention camp operated during the period of British colonial rule in India. Located in Hijli, beside Kharagpur,  (a part of former Hijli Kingdom) in the district of Midnapore West, West Bengal, India, it played a significant role in the Indian independence movement of the 19th and 20th centuries.

The large numbers of those who participated in armed struggles or the non-cooperation movement against the British could not be accommodated in ordinary jails. The British colonial government decided to establish a few detention camps; the first one was located in Buxa Fort followed by the creation of Hijli Detention Camp in 1930. A significant moment in the Indian independence movement occurred at here in 1931 when two unarmed detainees, Santosh Kumar Mitra and Tarakeswar Sengupta, were shot dead by the Indian Imperial Police. Subhas Chandra Bose came to Hijli to collect their bodies for interment. Many Indian nationalists, including Nobel laureate Rabindranath Tagore, voiced strong protests against the British Raj over this incident. The firing which later known as "Hijli firing" is the only incident of police firing inside a detention camp.

The detention camp was closed in 1937 and was reopened in 1940. In 1942 it was closed for the final time and the detainees were transferred elsewhere. During the Second World War it was occupied by the US Air Force.

Today, the camp is also known for being the birthplace of Indian Institute of Technology - Kharagpur, which started in 1951. In 1990, a part of the former detention camp buildings were converted to house the Nehru Museum of Science and Technology.

References

External links
 Nehru Museum of Science & Technology

Internment camps
World War II internment camps
Indian independence movement